Codru is a town in Chișinău municipality, Moldova.

References

Cities and towns in Chișinău Municipality
Cities and towns in Moldova